The Machine Age is an era that includes the early-to-mid 20th century, sometimes also including the late 19th century. An approximate dating would be about 1880 to 1945. Considered to be at its peak in the time between the first and second world wars, the Machine Age overlaps with the late part of the Second Industrial Revolution (which ended around 1914 at the start of World War I) and continues beyond it until 1945 at the end of World War II. The 1940s saw the beginning of the Atomic Age, where modern physics saw new applications such as the atomic bomb, the first computers, and the transistor. The Digital Revolution ended the intellectual model of the machine age founded in the mechanical and heralding a new more complex model of high technology.  The digital era has been called the Second Machine Age, with its increased focus on machines that do mental tasks.

Universal chronology

Developments

Artifacts of the Machine Age include:
 Reciprocating steam engine replaced by gas turbines, internal combustion engines and electric motors
 Electrification based on large hydroelectric and thermal electric power production plants and distribution systems
 Mass production of high-volume goods on moving assembly lines, particularly of the automobile
 Gigantic production machinery, especially for producing and working metal, such as steel rolling mills, bridge component fabrication, and automobile body presses
 Powerful earthmoving equipment
 Steel framed buildings of great height (the skyscraper)
 Radio and phonograph technology
 High speed printing presses, enabling the production of low cost newspapers and mass market magazines
 Low cost appliances for the mass market that employ fractional horsepower electric motors, such as the vacuum cleaner and the washing machine
 Fast and comfortable long distance travel by railroad, automobile, and aircraft
 Development and employment of modern war machines such as tanks, aircraft, submarines and the modern battleship
 Streamline designs in automobiles and trains, influenced by aircraft design

Social influence
 The rise of mass market advertising and consumerism
 Nationwide branding and distribution of goods, replacing local arts and crafts
 Nationwide cultural leveling due to exposure to films and network broadcasting
 Mass-produced government propaganda through print, audio, and motion pictures
 Replacement of skilled crafts with low skilled labor
 Growth of strong corporations through their abilities to exploit economies of scale in materials and equipment acquisition, manufacturing, and distribution
 Corporate exploitation of labor leading to the creation of strong trade unions as a countervailing force
 Aristocracy with weighted suffrage or male-only suffrage replaced by democracy with universal suffrage, parallel to one-party states
 First-wave feminism
 Increased economic planning, including five-year plans, public works and occasional war economy, including nationwide conscription and rationing

Environmental influence
 Exploitation of natural resources with little concern for the ecological consequences; a continuation of 19th century practices but at a larger scale.
 Release of synthetic dyes, artificial flavorings, and toxic materials into the consumption stream without testing for adverse health effects.
 Rise of petroleum as a strategic resource

International relations
 Conflicts between nations regarding access to energy sources (particularly oil) and material resources (particularly iron and various metals with which it is alloyed) required to ensure national self-sufficiency. Such conflicts were contributory to two devastating world wars.
 Climax of New Imperialism and beginning of decolonization

Arts and architecture

The Machine Age is considered to have influenced:
Dystopian films including Charlie Chaplin's Modern Times and Fritz Lang's  Metropolis
Streamline Moderne appliance design and architecture
Bauhaus style

Modern art
Cubism
Art Deco decorative style
Futurism
Music

See also
 Second Industrial Revolution

References

Historical eras
History of technology
Second Industrial Revolution
19th century in technology
20th century in technology
Machines